Trial & Error is the ninth album by Classified.

Track listing
"Intro"  – 1:03
"Gossip"  – 3:48
"Heavy Artillery"  – 3:51
"On tha Brink"  – 2:18
"Unexpected" – 3:48
"Just the Way It Is" (ft. Eternia, DL Incognito & Maestro Fresh Wes)  – 4:13
"Got Luv"  – 3:16
"Interlude"  – 0:13
"Trial & Error"  – 3:39
"It's Sickening" (ft. Mic Boyd)  – 3:32
"This Is For"  – 3:30
"Confused Confrontations"  – 3:04
"Three Beats & A MC"  – 3:12
"Like It's Criminal" (ft. Bonshah, J-Bru & Spesh K)  – 8:23

Singles
"Gossip/This Is For" (2003)
"Heavy Artillery" (2003)
"Unexpected" (2003)

References

Classified (rapper) albums
2003 albums